Alexander Stewart (1746–1831), known as Alexander Stewart of Ards, was an Irish landowner and member of parliament.

Birth and origins 
Alexander was born on 26 March 1746 in Ireland. He was the fifth son of Alexander Stewart and his wife Mary Cowan. His father's family was Ulster Scots and came from County Donegal. His father had bought the Newtownards and Comber estates in County Down in 1743 and lived at Mount Stewart, near Newtownards. His father also still was an alderman of Londonderry (or Derry) in 1760. His grandfather, Colonel William Stewart, had commanded one of the two companies of Protestant soldiers that Derry admitted into town when Mountjoy was sent to Derry by Tyrconnell before the start of the siege. Alexander's mother was a daughter of John Cowan, alderman of Derry and sister of Robert Cowan, Governor of Bombay. Her family also was Ulster Scots. His parents had married on 30 June 1737 in Dublin. He had six siblings, who are listed in his father's article.

Ards House 
In 1782, after his father's death in the preceding year, Alexander Stewart, probably using some money from the inheritance, bought the Ards House and some surrounding lands near it on the shores of Sheephaven Bay near Dunfanaghy, County Donegal, for £13,250 from William Wray and started to live there. He and his heirs were therefore known as the Stewarts of Ards. The Ards House was demolished in the early 1960s, but the wooded park in which it stood still exists and is known as the Ards Forest Park.

Marriage 
On 2 October 1791 Alexander Stewart of Ards, as he was now, married Mary Moore, daughter of Charles Moore, 1st Marquess of Drogheda and granddaughter of Francis Seymour-Conway, 1st Marquess of Hertford. Mary was the niece of Sarah Frances Seymour-Conway, the first wife of Alexander's eldest brother Robert, Lord Londonderry.

 
Alexander and Mary had among other children three sons who reached adulthood:
Alexander Robert Stewart (1795–1850), succeeded him
Charles Moore (1799–1831), became a minister of a church, probably Presbyterian
John Vandeleur (1802–1872) of Rock Hill (near Letterkenny)

Politics and later life 
Stewart was appointed High Sheriff of Donegal for 1791–92.

Stewart sat as member of parliament (MP) in the Irish Parliament in 1800–1801. He was elected for the Londonderry County constituency of the Irish Parliament in 1800, sat for Londonderry County for one month and then exchanged it for the borough of Thomastown for which he sat until Irish Parliament was abolished due to the Acts of Union in 1801.

Stewart also sat for the UK Parliament in 1814–1818. On 19 July 1814 he was elected for the Londonderry constituency of the U.K. Parliament to replace his nephew Sir Charles Stewart who had on 1 July 1814 been raised to the peerage as Baron Stewart. He thus served as "a family stopgap" who "supported [the Earl of Liverpool's Tory] government silently". He sat for the constituency for four years until the 1818 general election, when his son Alexander-Robert was elected, having come of age.

Alexander Stewart of Ards died in 1831.

Notes and references

Notes

Citation

Sources 

  – (Snippet view)
  – L to Z
  – Scotland and Ireland

External links 

Stewart of Ards family papers at the Public Record Office of Northern Ireland

1746 births
1831 deaths
High Sheriffs of Donegal
Members of the Parliament of the United Kingdom for County Londonderry constituencies (1801–1922)
UK MPs 1812–1818
Alexander